Shorea parvifolia is a species of tree in the family Dipterocarpaceae, commonly known as light red meranti and white lauan. It is native to tropical southeastern Asia.

Description

Distribution and habitat
Shorea parvifolia is native to Peninsular Malaysia, Thailand, Borneo and Sumatra. It grows on both clayey and sandy soils, in swampy areas and riverbanks, and on drier hillsides and ridges.

Ecology
This tree flowers in an irregular cycle lasting three to seven years, with all the trees flowering simultaneously. Pollination is mostly performed by beetles and thrips. The fruits have wings but mostly land within  of the parent tree. When the seeds falls on fallow land, the saplings do not at first grow as fast as the pioneer species such as Macaranga. However the saplings are shade tolerant, and after thirty years, Shorea parvifolia and Pentace laxiflora dominate the other tree species. The tree roots form ectomycorrhizal relationships with a variety of soil fungi.

Uses
The timber is pink or pinkish-brown with white resinous streaks. It is typically used for panelling, joinery, light carpentry, furniture, plywood, crates, boxes, veneers and other purposes.

Status
Shorea parvifolia has a wide range and is a common species. It is under threat from selective logging of the best trees, which may reduce the genetic diversity of the population, and from clearance of forests to make way for palm oil and other plantations. Nevertheless, it is listed by the International Union for Conservation of Nature as being of least concern as it does not currently meet the criteria for a more threatened category.

References

parvifolia
Trees of Sumatra
Trees of Peninsular Malaysia
Trees of Borneo
Trees of Thailand